The giant litter skink (Caledoniscincus festivus) is a species of lizard in the family Scincidae. It is endemic to New Caledonia.

References

Caledoniscincus
Skinks of New Caledonia
Endemic fauna of New Caledonia
Reptiles described in 1913
Taxa named by Jean Roux